Selena Samuela is an Italian-American Peloton instructor based in New York. She was born and raised in Italy until she was eleven years old when her family relocated to Elmira, New York.

Following college in Hawaii, Samuela moved to New York City where she studied acting at the Stella Adler Studio of Acting. She used stunt lessons as an attempt to begin work as an actor before becoming an amateur boxer following her work at Gleason's Gym. Samuela was recruiter to work for Peloton Interactive after teaching fitness classes and working as a personal trainer at a boutique studio.

Samuela married Matt Virtue in Palm Beach, Florida in March 2022. She lives in Rye, New York.

References

External links

Peloton instructors
Living people
Year of birth missing (living people)